Chatham (foaled 1928) was an outstanding Australian Thoroughbred racehorse that was bred by Percy Miller at the Kia Ora Stud near Scone in the Hunter Region, New South Wales.

Pedigree
He was the best son of the 1925 Melbourne Cup winner Windbag.  His dam Myosotis was a granddaughter of the 1899 English Triple Crown winner, Flying Fox. Myosotis was the dam of eight foals all of which raced and included four winners. Chatham's half-brother, Cetosis was the best of these four winners, having won 16 races in Perth, Western Australia and in the country. Chatham's fourth dam, Paqresseuse was a sister to the undefeated Grand Flaneur.

Chatham was sold at the 1930 Sydney yearling sales for 650 guineas to trainer, Ike Foulsham.

Racing record
Chatham raced from 1931 to 1934, becoming one of the great milers to race in Australia who won 12 out of 21 times at that distance and often while carrying very high weights. In 1931 he ran second by two and a half lengths to Phar Lap in the prestigious Cox Plate then came back in the 1932 running to earn the first of his two Cox Plate wins. As well, Chatham won both the Linlithgow Stakes and the Craven Plate three times. He won three other races twice: the Epsom Handicap in 1932 and 1933, and both the Warwick and Hill Stakes in 1933 and 1934. At the finish of his racing career he had won 21 stakes or Principal Races.

Chatham was one of the great runners in the inter-war period and in 2005 was inducted in the Australian Racing Hall of Fame.

Stud record
Retired to stud in 1935 he stood initially in NSW. In later years he stood in South Australia where he was a leading sire.  His last foal was born in 1950. 
Among Chatham's progeny, he was the sire of:
 Craigie (born 1940) - won Sydney Cup etc.
 Chatspa (born 1942) - Adelaide Cup, a three-time winner of the SAJC Birthday Cup
 Conservator (1943) SAJC South Australian Derby etc.
 High Rank (born 1936) - won the Stradbroke Handicap

Chatham sired 16 stakeswinners with 36 stakeswins for over £210,000 in prizemoney.

1934 racebook

See also
 Repeat winners of horse races

References

Australian Racing Hall of Fame horses

External links
Chatham's pedigree and partial racing stats

1928 racehorse births
Australian Racing Hall of Fame horses
Cox Plate winners
Racehorses bred in Australia
Racehorses trained in Australia
Thoroughbred family 14-a